Padri Lalpur is a village in Patara block of Ghatampur tehsil, in the district of Kanpur Nagar, in the Kanpur division of Uttar Pradesh state, India. It is 4 kilometres from Patara, 28 km from Kanpur and 115 km from Lucknow.

References

Neighbourhoods in Kanpur
Cities and towns in Kanpur Nagar district